The Korean Health, Education, Information and Research Center (KHEIR, Korean: 한인건강정보센터) is Los Angeles-based non-profit healthcare service agency established in 1986 to deliver medical services, including health education, health care, and social support, to the Korean American community, mainly assisting the low-income, recently immigrated, monolingual/limited English speaking Koreans.

External links 
KHEIR Homepage

Organizations based in Los Angeles
American people of Korean descent